Best Chicken is a 2019 South Korean television series starring Park Sun-ho, Kim So-hye and Joo Woo-jae. It aired from January 2 to February 7, 2019 on Wednesdays and Thursdays at 23:00 (KST) time slot of MBN and Dramax.

Plot
Park Choi-go quits from his office table job to open a chicken restaurant in a middle-income neighborhood of Seoul. Renting a plot of land where a sauna stands from the landlord, Seo Myung-dong, he has to face Myung-dong's temperamental granddaughter and the sauna's owner, Bo-ah. For the past five years, Bo-ah, a failing webtoon artist, has been holing up in the sauna after a conflict with a popular webtoon artist over ownership rights led to her being shunned from the community. Myung-dong asks Choi-go to admit Bo-ah as a part-timer in his restaurant in exchange for a lower rent fee, hoping that she can regain her spirit.

Bo-ah is hostile at Choi-go for disturbing her peace and regards him as simply a rich bourgeoisie who wanted to experience the life of a commoner. Helped by her childhood friends: Hwang Min-ah, Oh Yeong-ho, and Kim Kyu-man, they try to sabotage the joint through various means, such as handing out scathing flyers, which backfires when it turns viral and therefore garners attention. However, Choi-go's seriousness at his job and unfailing kindness to Bo-ah cause her to begin questioning her first impression. Since Choi-go never studied cooking, the restaurant operates at a loss until he hires Andrew Kang, a bum with a tremor who used to work at a three-star Michelin restaurant.

Around the time when Bo-ah softens and falls in love with Choi-go, two adversaries come into the scene. The first is Choi-go's ex-girlfriend, Moon So-dam, who works at a food TV program and wants to reconnect with Choi-go by doing a free publicity of the joint. During the broadcast, Min-ah, Yeong-ho, and Kyu-man successfully do a sabotage, causing its suspension for two months. So-dam becomes suspicious of Bo-ah, who did not participate in the plan, tries to warn Choi-go, who refuses to believe her, and attempts to catch the trio off-guard when they try another sabotage. However, Andrew bails them at the last minute and makes them promise not to do it again. The second adversary is Choi-go's domineering mother, So Oh-sook, who is angry at him for quitting his previous job and attempts to reduce his chance of winning big by opening a chicken joint down the street after tricking Bo-ah into giving her his recipe.

Feeling guilty, Bo-ah admits her previous actions to Choi-go and considers resigning. While upset, Choi-go comes to realize that he has grown to love her and confesses, begging her to stay. Min-ah, Yeong-ho, and Kyu-man are initially livid at Bo-ah for not telling them to stop harassing Choi-go sooner, but quickly make amends when a tragedy strikes her: the death of Myung-dong. During the funeral, Bo-ah's deadbeat father, Gong-cheol suddenly appears to take his legal inheritance, despite the fact that his father had left all his possessions to Bo-ah, and redevelop the neighborhood, which would raze the chicken joint to the ground. Assisted by her friends, Bo-ah manages to convince the neighborhood not to sell their land.

Several months later, Choi-go's chicken joint is growing popular. Oh-sook chooses to stop bothering Choi-go and sell her joint. So-dam has moved on and is dating Choi-go's brother, Joon-hyuk, with whom she grew closer while investigating Bo-ah and her friends. Thinking that he has nothing more to offer to Choi-go, Andrew resigns and opens a restaurant nearby. Bo-ah, meanwhile, finally decides to draw webtoon again, having made a promise to Myung-dong to live her life to the fullest.

Cast

Main
 Park Sun-ho as Park Choi-go (28 years old)
 An employee of a large corporation who quits his job to open his own chicken restaurant, which he considers a dream project. He is a very optimistic and idealistic man, sometimes outrageously so.
 Kim So-hye as Seo Bo-ah (25 years old)
 The owner of a public bathhouse that her grandfather rented out without her consent who dreams of becoming a webtoon artist. She has a negative view of the world after her work was rejected five years ago because of a feud with another webtoon artist, regarding everyone new to her as a nuisance.
 Joo Woo-jae as Andrew Kang (33 years old)
 A once promising chef who is currently homeless. A serious person at all times, Andrew has a bad case of tremor which discourages him from doing physical work for a long time. A running gag in the series is characters mispronouncing his Western name, such as Edward or Alexander.

Supporting
 Lee Seung-hyub as Park Joon-hyuk
 Choi-go's older brother who is an Oriental Medicine doctor. He excels in academic studies, but is bad at table waiting, as the chicken joint find out when he substitutes for Bo-ah while she is on vacation.
 Son Min-ji as Hwang Min-ah
 Bo-ah's friend who is smart and does all the planning. She works as secretary at the neighborhood's real estate firm.
 Jeon Seong-hwan as Oh Yeong-ho
 Bo-ah's friend who likes to fool around. He runs the neighborhood grocery store.
 Yoo Moon-chi as Kim Kyu-man
 Bo-ah's friend who runs the neighborhood butcher shop. He has an identical younger cousin who is still a high schools student.
 Myung Kye-nam as Seo Myung-dong
 Bo-ah's paternal grandfather and the landlord of the neighborhood. Though appearing grumpy, he is very caring to Bo-ah, having raised her by himself since young after her mother died and her father left.
 Hong Soon-chang as the real estate manager and Min-ah's grandfather.
 Ahn Young-chae as Kwon-hyuk
 A legendarily fast delivery man from the neighborhood who speaks very little. Near the end of the series, he is hired by Choi-go to become the chicken joint's delivery man.
 Na In-woo as Lee Jin-sang
 A popular webtoon artist whose feud with Bo-ah over ownership rights led to her being excluded from the community. 
 Sora Jung as So Oh-sook
 Choi-go's and Joon-hyuk's overbearing mother and a retired restaurant manager. When her husband was unable to find a job, she became the family's sole breadwinner, which the brothers speak of positively, but it also caused her to develop a view that only she knows what is best for them.
 Ah Young as Moon So-dam
 Choi-go's ex-girlfriend who works at a TV station specializing in food programs.
 Hongseok as Bae Ki-bum
 A part-timer at Choi-go's restaurant. He is hired by the chicken joint as additional manpower when So-dam's TV crew is about to shoot.
 Choi Sung-kook as Seo Gong-cheol
 Bo-ah's father. He abandoned the family when she was young and only reappears in her life after Myung-dong's death.

Production
Filming began in September 2018.

Original soundtrack

Part 1

Part 2

Part 3

Part 4

Part 5

Ratings

References

External links
  (Dramax) 
 Official website (MBN) 
 
 

Maeil Broadcasting Network television dramas
Korean-language television shows
2019 South Korean television series debuts
2019 South Korean television series endings
South Korean romantic comedy television series